In 2002–03, Associazione Calcio Milan enjoyed a triumphant season, winning both the UEFA Champions League and the Coppa Italia. In their 6th conquest of Europe's most prestigious competition, Milan defeated fierce rivals Juventus on penalties after a 0–0 draw in an all-Italian final, while in the Coppa Italia they overcame Roma. In the Serie A, Milan were top of the table in January, but would eventually finish 3rd behind Juventus and Inter, thus missing the chance to complete the treble.

This was Milan's first successful season since 1998–99. Important new arrivals included Italian international centre-back Alessandro Nesta (signed from Lazio for  €31 million –Milan's most expensive transfer in the summer of 2002) who strengthened a defence that was already among Europe's most formidable, versatile Dutch international midfielder Clarence Seedorf (signed from cross-city rivals Inter for  €29 million) and Danish international striker Jon Dahl Tomasson, who was mainly used to back up regular starters Andriy Shevchenko and Filippo Inzaghi. Brazilian superstar Rivaldo, the most high-profile of the new signings, had a peripheral role in the Serie A, but was influential in the Champions League, appearing in 13 out of 17 matches, although not in the final, where he was an unused substitute.

This season also saw Milan manager Carlo Ancelotti beginning to utilise the unconventional 4–4–2 diamond (or 4–1–2–1–2) formation, which he would continue to employ on many occasions in later seasons. This formation allowed Ancelotti to field both Andrea Pirlo and Rui Costa in the starting eleven, with Pirlo as a deep-lying playmaker or regista and Rui Costa as an attacking midfielder or trequartista; the 4–1–2–1–2 worked well for Milan in large part thanks to the effectiveness, hard work and stamina of central midfielders Clarence Seedorf and Gennaro Gattuso.

Players

Squad information
Squad at end of season

Transfers

Autumn

Winter

Spring

Reserve squad

Left club during season

Competitions

Overall

Serie A

League table

Results by round

Matches

Notes
 Note 1: Torino v Milan was abandoned with 27 minutes to go, after the crowd started to riot. The result was confirmed as 3–0 in favor of Milan by the FIGC. Torino was given a match suspension from playing at home until the end of season.

Coppa Italia

Round of 16

Quarter-finals

Semi-finals

Final

UEFA Champions League

Third qualifying round

Group stage

Second group stage

Knockout phase

Quarter-finals

Semi-finals

Final

Statistics

Players statistics

References

A.C. Milan seasons
Milan
UEFA Champions League-winning seasons